Ryan Benjamin may refer to:

 Ryan Benjamin (long snapper) (born 1977), American football player
 Ryan Benjamin (running back) (born 1970), American football player